The 3rd constituency of Gard is a French legislative constituency in the Gard département.  It consists of the cantons of  Bagnols-sur-Cèze, Roquemaure and Villeneuve-lès-Avignon, and the communes of Aramon and Remoulins.

Deputies

Election Results

2022

 
 
 
 
 
 
 
|-
| colspan="8" bgcolor="#E9E9E9"|
|-

2017

2012

2007

 
 
 
 
 
 
|-
| colspan="8" bgcolor="#E9E9E9"|
|-

2002

 
 
 
 
 
 
|-
| colspan="8" bgcolor="#E9E9E9"|
|-

1997

 
 
 
 
 
 
 
|-
| colspan="8" bgcolor="#E9E9E9"|
|-

References

Gard
French legislative constituencies of Gard